Dichaea muricata is a species of orchid.

Description
It is a small orchid that grows in warm, wet environments. It is similar to a hanging reed with several leaves, strictly ovate, and it blooms with fragrant flowers 1–2 cm in length that appear at the end of the axils of the leaves. Flowering occurs in winter.

Distribution 
It is found on Hispaniola, Jamaica, Trinidad and Tobago, Venezuela, Colombia, Peru, and Brazil.

External links

muricata
Flora of Hispaniola
Flora without expected TNC conservation status